Nenita Adan (born 4 July 1965) is a Filipino hurdler. She competed in the women's 400 metres hurdles at the 1988 Summer Olympics.

References

External links

1965 births
Living people
Athletes (track and field) at the 1988 Summer Olympics
Filipino female hurdlers
Olympic track and field athletes of the Philippines
Place of birth missing (living people)
Southeast Asian Games medalists in athletics
Southeast Asian Games gold medalists for the Philippines
Competitors at the 1987 Southeast Asian Games